Svea Court of Appeal, located in Stockholm, is one of six appellate courts in the Swedish legal system. It is located in the Wrangel Palace, on Riddarholmen islet in Gamla Stan, the old town of Stockholm.

History
The Svea Court of Appeal was founded in 1614 and was the highest court in Sweden until 1789, when the Supreme Court of Sweden was established.

Among people sentenced to death by the court was Nicolaus Olai Campanius, convicted of being a Catholic, and Jacob Johan Anckarström, convicted of the assassination of Gustaf III of Sweden.

Buildings
The Svea Court of Appeal is located in several buildings on Riddarholmen. Apart from the Wrangel Palace, which is the main building, it also has divisions in i.a. the Hessenstein Palace, the Stenbock Palace and the Schering-Rosenhane Palace.

See also
 Courts of appeal in Sweden

Literature
 Korpiola, Mia (ed.): The Svea Court of Appeal on the Early Modern Period: Historical Reinterpretations and New Perspectives. (Rättshistoriska studier, 26.) Stockholm: Institutet för Rättshistorisk Forskning, 2014. .

External links
Svea Court of Appeal website 
Svea Court of Appeal — Website in English 

Courts in Sweden
Appellate courts
Government buildings in Sweden
Buildings and structures in Stockholm
1614 establishments in Sweden